P&G Korea (Procter & Gamble Korea Inc.; hangul:한국피앤지) is a Korean consumer goods company headquartered in Yeoksam-dong, Gangnam-gu, Seoul, Korea. It is a subsidiary of the multinational consumer goods company Procter & Gamble.

The company was established as Seotong P&G (서통피앤지) in 1989, and changed its name to Korea P&G (한국피앤지) in 1993. It produces many popular chemical, food, paper, and personal care products, and has manufacturing facilities in Cheonan and Osan. The CEO of P&G Korea is Balaka Niyazee.

History
Established in 1989 as Seotong P&G with capital of 11 billion KRW.
In 1992 Seotong P&G 70 billion A sole investment South Korea Cheon-an Factory completion
In 1993 the company changed its name from Seotong P&G to Korea P&G; with its capital increasing to 107 billion KRW.
In 1997 Korea P&G merged with SsangYong Paper Co.
Exports exceeded US$70 million in 1999.

Products launched
1989 Ivory soap
1989 Whisper toilet paper 
1989 Pampers baby diapers (later renamed Cutie) 
1993 Pantene haircare products launched 
1995 Vidal Sassoon haircare products launched
1997 Pringles potato crisps
1999 Febreze disodorant
1999 Cutie Super Premium toilet paper
1999 Whisper Green/Whisper Fresh toilet paper 
2000 SK-II cosmetics line
2000 Charmin toilet paper
2000 Attends adult briefs, 
2000 Joy dishwashing liquid 
2003 Head & Shoulders dandruff haircare products, 
2003 Crest Spin electric toothbrush 
2004 Wella haircare products
2004 Whisper Soft toilet paper
2004 Pantene Amino-Pro Vitamin shampoo 
2005 Gillette shaving products

Awards

2000: Receives Korea Logistics Award.
2001: Ranked 1st in Consumer Satisfaction Index by KCSI and NCSI, awarded 'Human Resource Management Award' by Korea Efficiency Association.
2002: Ranked 97th on Fortune's 100 best companies to work for, Vidal Sassoon is picked for Brand Power Award by Korea Efficiency Association.
2006: Ranked 3rd on Fortune's Most Admired Companies and 1st on Fortune's Most Admired Companies in the Consumer Goods Industry.
2007: Ranked 3rd on Fortune's Most Admired Companies and 1st on Fortune's Most Admired Companies in the Consumer Goods Industry.
2008: Ranked 2nd on Barron's Most Admired Companies, 5th on Fortune's Most Admired Companies, and 1st on Fortune's Most Admired Companies in the Consumer Goods Industry.

Products
As of 2017, the products that the company produces are SK-II, Febreze, Gillette, Whisper, and Downy.

See also
Economy of South Korea
Procter & Gamble

References

External links
P&G Korea Homepage (in Korean)

Procter & Gamble
Cosmetics companies of South Korea
Chemical companies of South Korea
Manufacturing companies based in Seoul